Luis C. Morse (born May 20, 1940) is a retired American politician.

Morse previously served as a state representative in the House of Representatives of the U.S. state of Florida. He currently lives in Miami, Florida with his family.

Education
Morse received his bachelor's degree in Engineering from the University of Florida in 1968.

References

External links
Official Website of Luis Morse

University of Florida alumni
Republican Party members of the Florida House of Representatives
1940 births
Living people
20th-century American politicians
Hispanic and Latino American state legislators in Florida
American politicians of Cuban descent